Yacine Bammou (born 11 September 1991) is a professional footballer who plays as a striker for Qatari club Al-Shamal and the Morocco national team.

Club career
Bammou made his Ligue 1 debut on 9 August 2014 against Lens in a 1–0 home win replacing Fernando Aristeguieta after 64 minutes. One minute later he scored the winning goal.

In July 2018, he signed a four-year contract with Caen. 

On 2 July 2021, he returned to Turkey and joined Ümraniyespor.

International career

International goals
Scores and results list Morocco's goal tally first.

References

1991 births
Footballers from Paris
French sportspeople of Moroccan descent
Living people
French footballers
Moroccan footballers
Morocco international footballers
Association football forwards
Évry FC players
FC Nantes players
Luçon FC players
Stade Malherbe Caen players
Alanyaspor footballers
Ümraniyespor footballers
Al-Shamal SC players
Ligue 1 players
Ligue 2 players
Championnat National players
Süper Lig players
TFF First League players
Qatar Stars League players
French expatriate footballers
Moroccan expatriate footballers
Expatriate footballers in Turkey
French expatriate sportspeople in Turkey
Moroccan expatriate sportspeople in Turkey
Expatriate footballers in Qatar
French expatriate sportspeople in Qatar
Moroccan expatriate sportspeople in Qatar